Beamore or Bey More in County Meath is a townland which lies just south of Drogheda in Ireland. Together with the nearby townland of Bryanstown, Beamore forms part of the southern suburbs of Drogheda (which lies across the county bounds in County Louth).

The remains of a 13th-century monastic settlement and farm, known as Beaubec Monastery, are located in the area.

References

External links
Beamore Heritage Trail

Drogheda
Townlands of County Meath